Elsey was an electoral division of the Northern Territory Legislative Assembly in Australia. One of the original divisions, it was first contested in 1974 and was abolished in 1987. It was named after Elsey National Park. It was largely replaced by the new and considerably smaller electorate of Katherine, as population growth in the town of Katherine had resulted in the removal of much of the rural area of the electorate in the 1986 electoral redistribution.

Members for Elsey

Election results

Elections in the 1970s

 Preferences were not distributed.
 The number of votes each individual Independent received is unknown.

 The number of votes each individual Independent received is unknown.
 The independent candidate that came second on preferences is unknown.

Elections in the 1980s

|- style="background-color:#E9E9E9"
! colspan="6" style="text-align:left;" |After distribution of preferences

 Preferences were not distributed to completion.

References

Former electoral divisions of the Northern Territory